The Amphitheatre of Mérida is a ruined Roman amphitheatre situated in the Roman colony of Emerita Augusta, present-day Mérida, in Spain. The city itself, Emerita Augusta, was founded in 25 BC by Augustus, to resettle emeritus soldiers discharged from the Roman army from two veteran legions of the Cantabrian Wars (the Legio V Alaudae and Legio X Gemina). The amphitheatre itself was completed in 8 BC. The term emeritus refers to the soldiers, all of whom had been honorably discharged from service. The city became the capital of the Roman province of Lusitania.

The amphitheatre is part of the Archaeological Ensemble of Mérida, which is one of the largest and most extensive archaeological sites in Spain. It was declared a World Heritage Site by UNESCO in 1993.

History
The amphitheatre was inaugurated in the year 8 BC. This building was intended for gladiatorial fights and combats between beasts or men and beasts (venationes).

Architectural features
The sand-covered arena in the centre had a fossa bestiaria in the center, which was covered with wood and sand. This fossa was used to house animals before they were released into the arena.

Its design consists of a grandstand with ima, media and summa cavea, and a central arena. The stands had a capacity of approximately 15,000 spectators and had supporting stairs and hallways (scalae) that connected the different parts internally. The ima cavea had of a row reserved for the local élite and ten more for members of the public. There were also two stands located at both sides of the minor axis: one above the main entrance hall and another in front. Under them were the monumental inscription from which the amphitheatre can be dated.

See also
 List of Roman amphitheatres

External links 
 Official website of the City council of Mérida
 Official website of the entity that manages the amphitheater and the archaeological ensemble

Roman amphitheatres in Spain
Amphitheatre
Amphitheatre of Mérida
8 BC
Amphitheatre of Mérida
Amphitheatre of Mérida